The 1977 Cleveland mayoral election took place on November 8, 1977, to elect the Mayor of Cleveland, Ohio. The election was won by Dennis Kucinich. The election was officially nonpartisan, with the top two candidates from the October 4 primary advancing to the general election.

In an upset defeat, incumbent mayor Ralph Perk failed to advance past the primary.

Kucinich, at 31 years of age, became the youngest mayor of a major United States city.

Candidates
Ed Feighan, Ohio State Representative
Alyson Kennedy
Dennis Kucinich, city council member
Ralph Perk, incumbent Republican mayor

Primary election

General election

References

1970s in Cleveland
Cleveland mayoral
Cleveland
Dennis Kucinich
Mayoral elections in Cleveland
Non-partisan elections
November 1977 events in the United States